The Museum of Secret Surveillance, also known as House of Leaves (Shtëpia me Gjethe) is a historical museum in Tirana, Albania. It opened on 23 May 2017 in the building that served as the Sigurimi's headquarter during the communist era.

The museum is "dedicated to the innocent people who were spied on, arrested, prosecuted, convicted and executed during the communist regime."

History 
The museum is housed in a two-story villa with a courtyard that dates from 1931 and originally served as the first private obstetrics clinic in Albania, while during the German occupation, the building was used by the Gestapo. After the war it was used as the Sigurimi's interception headquarters until the collapse of the communist regime in 1991.

The Museum of Secret Surveillance opened on 23 May 2017. The building is located in the city center. The building is known as the “House of Leaves”, so called because of the clambering plant that covers its facade. It has 31 rooms.

The museum was awarded the prize of European Museum of the Year Award 2020 by the Council of Europe.

See also 
 Culture of Tirana
 Landmarks in Tirana 
 History of Albania

References

External links 
Official Website  
Official Website 

Museums in Tirana
Museums established in 2017
History museums